To date, the nuclear accidents at the Chernobyl (1986) and Fukushima Daiichi (2011) nuclear power plants, are the only INES level 7 nuclear accidents.

Chernobyl and Fukushima nuclear accidents
The following table compares the Chernobyl and Fukushima nuclear accidents.

Radioactive contamination discharge

See also 
Comparison of Chernobyl and other radioactivity releases
Deaths due to the Chernobyl disaster
List of accidents at the Mayak facility

Notes

References

External links 
 How Much Fuel Is at Risk at Fukushima?
Chernobyl Accident. World Nuclear Association. 
Fukushima Nuclear Crisis Unwrapped
Fukushima Nuclear Accident. IAEA Update Log
BBC News: Fukushima and Chernobyl compared

Environmental impact of nuclear power
Scientific comparisons
Fukushima Daiichi nuclear disaster
Chernobyl disaster